Palavayal is a village in the eastern hilly areas of Kasaragod district in the Indian state of Kerala. Palavayal consists of small villages like Odakkolly, Chavaragiri and Malankadavu. Palavayal is separated from another town Pulingome (Separated by Kariangode River and connected by a bridge across this River) which is in Kannur District. 

Catholic Church in palavayal is in the name of apostle John.

Geography 
Palavayal is situated on the banks of the Kariangode River also known as tejaswiny which is originated from  Brahmagiri hill (not to be confused with the Brahmagiri range further south) in Karnataka. It is the main gateway to Coorg district, Karnataka.

Demographics 
As of the 2011 Indian census, Palavayal had a population of 9,923 in 2,371 households. Males constitute 49.85% of the population and females 50.15%.

Transportation
This village is connected to Karnataka state through Panathur. There is a 20 km road from Panathur to Sullia in Karnataka from where Bangalore and Mysore can be easily accessed. Locations in Kerala can be accessed by driving towards the western side. The nearest railway stations are Nileshwar railway station (36 KM) and Payyanur railway station (42 KM) on Mangalore-Palakkad line. There are airports at Kannur (70 km) Mangalore (128 km) and Calicut (180 KM).

References 

Nileshwaram area